Seven Days in Utopia is a 2011 American Christian sports drama film  directed by Matt Russell, starring Robert Duvall, Lucas Black, and Melissa Leo.

The film is based on the book Golf's Sacred Journey: Seven Days at the Links of Utopia by Dr. David Lamar Cook, a psychologist who received a Ph.D. in Sport and Performance Psychology from the University of Virginia.

It was filmed in Utopia, Texas, and Fredericksburg, Texas, and was released in the United States on September 2, 2011 to mixed reviews.

Plot summary
Lucas Black plays Luke Chisholm, a young professional golfer who has a meltdown during a tournament. After shooting 80 in the final round, Chisholm crashes his car into a fence and finds himself stuck in Utopia, Texas while his car is repaired. He gets wisdom from retired golfer Johnny Crawford (Robert Duvall).

After some instruction and guidance, Chisholm reconciles with his overbearing father and enters the Valero Texas Open. He ends up in a playoff with the world's top golfer, T.K. Oh (K. J. Choi).

Cast
 Robert Duvall as Johnny Crawford
 Lucas Black as Luke Chisholm
 Melissa Leo as Lily
 K. J. Choi as T.K. Oh
 Kelly Tilghman as Golf Channel Reporter / Analyst
 Brandel Chamblee as Golf Channel Reporter / Analyst
 Deborah Ann Woll as Sarah
 Brian Geraghty as Jake
 Rickie Fowler as himself
 Stewart Cink as himself
 Rich Beem as himself

Reception
The film earned mixed reviews from professional critics.

The New York Post gave the film two out of four stars and claimed that "it goes down more smoothly than you'd imagine" thanks to Duvall's performance and an "excellent supporting cast." The Arizona Republic described Seven Days as "utterly predictable" and "bland," but also praised Duvall, who "has to be great here just to keep the movie afloat." Roger Ebert of the Chicago Sun-Times gave the film one star out of four, writing "I would rather eat a golf ball than see this movie again" and, of Duvall, "Only a great actor could give such a bad performance."

References

Further reading

Books 
 Cook, David Lamar, Golf's Sacred Journey: Seven Days at the Links of Utopia, Grand Rapids : Zondervan, 2009. 
 Cook, David Lamar, {https://www.amazon.com/Golfs-Sacred-Journey-Sequel-Utopia/dp/0310349982} "Golf's Sacred Journey, the Sequel: 7 More Days in Utopia"

Articles 
 Snider, Mike, "Q&A: Sports psychologist talks about golf, faith, 'Utopia'", USA Today, August 11, 2009

External links
 
 
 

2011 films
2010s sports drama films
American sports drama films
Films about Christianity
Films based on American novels
Films set in Texas
Films shot in Texas
Golf films
Films scored by Klaus Badelt
2011 drama films
2010s English-language films
2010s American films